Lassad Hassen Nouioui (born 8 March 1986), known simply as Lassad, is a former professional footballer who played as a forward.

After playing amateur football in his country of birth, he went on to represent Deportivo for several seasons, appearing in 107 official matches and scoring 29 goals. He also competed professionally in Scotland, Portugal, Japan and Tunisia. 

Born in France, Lassad represented the Tunisia national team internationally.

Club career

Deportivo
Lassad was born in Marseille, France, and he signed for Deportivo de La Coruña in January 2008 after arriving for free from Ligue 2's LB Châteauroux. After impressing with the Galicians' reserves he received his first opportunity with the first team, coming on as a substitute for Riki in the last minutes of a 3–0 home win over Villarreal CF on 1 February 2009. The following week, he earned a penalty which resulted in the final 1–1 away draw against RCD Mallorca.

On 13 February 2009, after some good overall performances, Lassad signed a professional contract, committing himself to the club until 2012. He scored his first La Liga goal on 5 April, in a 3–1 defeat at RCD Espanyol. After a successful campaign, he was officially promoted to the main squad for 2009–10, but struggled with several injuries, making only 19 league appearances.

In the 2010–11 season, a healthy Lassad played 33 matches and scored five goals but the team finished in 18th place, which resulted in relegation to Segunda División for the first time in 20 years. The following year, he helped them to win the championship and subsequently promote with 18 official goals.

On 7 September 2011, Lassad netted four times as Deportivo defeated Girona FC 5–1 in the second round of the Copa del Rey.

Celtic
On 2 September 2012, Lassad signed for Celtic on a two-year deal, after being released from his contract at Deportivo and passing his medical. His transfer was surrounded by controversy after Levante UD claimed to also have signed the player, who said Celtic was always his first choice.

Lassad scored his first goal for his new club on 17 November 2012, in a 2–0 away victory at Aberdeen. He netted his second 11 days later in another away fixture, against Heart of Midlothian.

On 31 August 2013, after featuring in 19 games across all competitions, Lassad was released.

Arouca
Lassad signed for Portuguese club F.C. Arouca on 4 December 2013. He made his debut in the Primeira Liga 11 days later, playing 35 minutes in a 2–0 home loss to Vitória de Guimarães.

Later years
On 2 September 2015, following a brief spell with FC Tokyo, Lassad signed a two-year contract with Tunisian Ligue Professionnelle 1 side Club Africain. In February 2018, after nearly two years of inactivity, the 31-year-old returned to Spain and joined CD Toledo from Segunda División B.

On 14 April 2018, Nouioui suffered cardiac arrest prior to a match against Real Madrid Castilla, being taken to the intensive care unit of an hospital in Toledo. One month later, he announced his retirement at the age of 32.

International career
Although born in France, Lassad opted to represent Tunisia at international level. He was called up to the senior team for the first time in March 2009 to participate in a 2010 FIFA World Cup qualifier against Kenya, but failed to make an appearance in the match.

Lassad earned his first cap three months later on 4 June, playing 15 minutes against Mozambique in another World Cup qualifier.

Career statistics

Club

International

Honours
Deportivo
Segunda División: 2011–12

Celtic
Scottish Premier League: 2012–13
Scottish Cup: 2012–13

References

External links

1986 births
Living people
French footballers
Tunisian footballers
Footballers from Marseille
Association football forwards
AC Ajaccio players
LB Châteauroux players
La Liga players
Segunda División players
Segunda División B players
Deportivo Fabril players
Deportivo de La Coruña players
CD Toledo players
Scottish Premier League players
Celtic F.C. players
Primeira Liga players
F.C. Arouca players
J1 League players
FC Tokyo players
Tunisian Ligue Professionnelle 1 players
Club Africain players
Tunisia international footballers
Tunisian expatriate footballers
Expatriate footballers in Spain
Expatriate footballers in Scotland
Expatriate footballers in Portugal
Expatriate footballers in Japan
Tunisian expatriate sportspeople in Spain
Tunisian expatriate sportspeople in Scotland
Tunisian expatriate sportspeople in Portugal